Zhang Hongwei is a paralympic athlete from China competing mainly in category F46 long and triple jump events.

Zhang Hongwei competed at the 2004 Summer Paralympics he was a part of the unsuccessful Chinese T42-46 relay team and competed in the long jump as well as winning bronze in the F46 triple jump.

References

External links
 

Paralympic athletes of China
Athletes (track and field) at the 2004 Summer Paralympics
Paralympic bronze medalists for China
Chinese male sprinters
Chinese male long jumpers
Chinese male triple jumpers
Living people
Medalists at the 2004 Summer Paralympics
Year of birth missing (living people)
Paralympic medalists in athletics (track and field)
21st-century Chinese people